The Arrondissement of Eeklo is one of the six administrative arrondissements in the Province of East Flanders, Belgium. It is one of the two arrondissements that form the Judicial Arrondissement of Ghent.

Municipalities
The Administrative Arrondissement of Eeklo consists of the following municipalities:
Assenede
Eeklo  
Kaprijke
Maldegem
Sint-Laureins
Zelzate

Eeklo